Shine: The Hits is the first compilation album by Christian pop rock group Newsboys. It was released in 2000, spanning recordings from 1988 to 1998 (songs from 1999's Love Liberty Disco, their latest studio album at the time, were left off the collection). Exclusive to the set were three new songs ("Joy", "Who?", and "Praises"), an update of their 1996 hit "God Is Not a Secret", featuring dc Talk's TobyMac, a remix of their hit "Shine", and an eight-minute "Mega-Mix" of several of their biggest hits. Also included is an extended version of "I'm Not Ashamed", which differs from the original album version.

Track listing

Personnel 

Newsboys
 Peter Furler – lead vocals, guitars, drums 
 Jody Davis – guitars, vocals 
 Jeff Frankenstein – keyboards, programming 
 Phil Joel – bass, vocals 
 Duncan Phillips – drums, percussion

Additional musicians
 Pop Steam Choir – backing vocals on "Joy"
 TobyMac – rap and rap spice on "God Is Not a Secret"
 Robert "Void" Caprio – additional loops and noises on "God Is Not a Secret"
 DJ Maj – DJ Cuts
 Dan Muckala – additional keyboards on "Who?"

Production

 Peter Furler – producer (1–5, 7, 9, 11, 12, 13, 15)
 Steve Taylor – producer (1–5, 9, 12, 13)
 Joe Baldridge – producer (6, 8, 12, 14), mixing (6, 8, 12, 14)
 Jeff Frankenstein – additional producer (6), producer (8)
 Tommy Sims – producer (16)
 Kip Kubin – producer (17)
 Tony Miracle – producer (17)
 Wes Campbell – executive producer 
 Lynn Nichols – executive producer
 Tom Lord-Alge – remixing (1)
 Joe Costa – recording (6, 8, 12, 14)
 Shawn McLean – recording (6, 8, 12, 14)
 Dan Rudin – recording (6, 8, 12, 14), engineer (16)
 Richie Biggs – additional engineer (6, 8, 12, 14)
 Jacquire King – additional engineer (6, 8, 12, 14)
 James Bauer – mix assistant (6, 8, 12, 14)
 Joey Turner – mix assistant (6, 8, 12, 14)
 Stephen Marcussen – mastering at Marcussen Mastering, Hollywood, California
 Christiév Carothers – creative director 
 Jan Cook – cover art
 Hunz (Twist) – inside package
 Jimmy Abegg – cover photography, inside photography, tray photography 
 Matthew Barnes – inside photography
 Allen Clark – inside photography
 Andrew Lichtenstein – inside photography

Studios
 The Bennett House, Franklin, Tennessee – recording location (6, 8, 12, 14)
 OmniSound Studios, Nashville, Tennessee – mixing location 
 The Sound Kitchen, Franklin, Tennessee – mixing location 
 Chessington Synthlabs – recording location, mixing location (17)

Shine: The Hits Live One Night in Pennsylvania
Shine: The Hits Live One Night in Pennsylvania was released to DVD in 2000.  While the title of the DVD is the same as the compilation album of the same name, it is essentially a re-release of the Newsboys' Live: One Night in Pennsylvania concert DVD, which was recorded during their Step Up to the Microphone tour in 1998. Because of this, not all of the songs are included on both the CD and DVD. Songs exclusive to the live DVD are "Cup O' Tea" (from their 1996 Take Me to Your Leader album), "Always," "Truth Be Known - Everybody Gets a Shot," and "Hallelujah" (the latter three taken from their Step Up to the Microphone album, which they were promoting at the time).  Songs not included on the DVD include all of the 2000 recordings and re-recordings ("Joy," "Who?," "Praises," "Mega-Mix," "God Is Not a Secret"), as well as "I Got Your Number" and "Where You Belong"/"Turn Your Eyes Upon Jesus."

"I'm Not Ashamed"
"Spirit Thing"
"Take Me to Your Leader"
"WooHoo"
"Cup O' Tea"
"Entertaining Angels"
"Always"
"Believe"
"Reality"
"Truth Be Known - Everybody Gets a Shot"
"Drum Solo"
"Breakfast"
"Step Up to the Microphone"
"Hallelujah"
"Shine"

Radio singles
All of the previously released songs had already been issued as singles to radio, and all five of the new tracks were eventually released as singles (this does not include the slightly different mix of "Shine" included in this set):
"Joy"
"Mega-Mix"
"Who?"
"God Is Not a Secret" (featuring TobyMac)
"Praises"

References 

2000 greatest hits albums
Newsboys compilation albums
Sparrow Records compilation albums